Tripelta is an extinct genus of prehistoric bony fish that lived during the Early Triassic epoch.

See also

 Prehistoric fish
 List of prehistoric bony fish

References

Early Triassic fish
Perleidiformes